Lithium hydroxide is an inorganic compound with the formula LiOH. It can exist as anhydrous or hydrated, and both forms are white hygroscopic solids. They are soluble in water and slightly soluble in ethanol. Both are available commercially. While classified as a strong base, lithium hydroxide is the weakest known alkali metal hydroxide.

Production
The preferred feedstock is hard-rock spodumene, where the lithium content is expressed as % lithium oxide.

Lithium carbonate route
Lithium hydroxide is often produced industrially from lithium carbonate in a metathesis reaction with calcium hydroxide: 

The initially produced hydrate is dehydrated by heating under vacuum up to 180 °C.

Lithium sulfate route
An alternative route involves the intermediacy of lithium sulfate:
α-spodumene → β-spodumene
β-spodumene + CaO →  + ...

The main by-products are gypsum and sodium sulphate, which have some market value.

Commercial setting
According to Bloomberg, Ganfeng Lithium Co. Ltd. (GFL or Ganfeng) and Albemarle were the largest producers in 2020 with around 25kt/y, followed by Livent Corporation (FMC) and SQM. Significant new capacity is planned, to keep pace with demand driven by vehicle electrification. Ganfeng are to expand lithium chemical capacity to 85,000 tons, adding the capacity leased from Jiangte, Ganfeng will become the largest lithium hydroxide producer globally in 2021.

Albemarle's Kemerton WA plant, originally planned to deliver 100kt/y has been scaled back to 50kt/y.

In 2020 Tianqi Lithium's, plant in Kwinana, Western Australia is the largest producer, with a capacity of 48kt/y.

Applications

Lithium ion batteries
Lithium hydroxide is mainly consumed in the production of cathode materials for lithium ion batteries such as lithium cobalt oxide and lithium iron phosphate. It is preferred over lithium carbonate as a precursor for lithium nickel manganese cobalt oxides.

Grease 
A popular lithium grease thickener is lithium 12-hydroxystearate, which produces a general-purpose lubricating grease due to its high resistance to water and usefulness at a range of temperatures.

Carbon dioxide scrubbing

Lithium hydroxide is used in breathing gas purification systems for spacecraft, submarines, and rebreathers to remove carbon dioxide from exhaled gas by producing lithium carbonate and water:

or

The latter, anhydrous hydroxide, is preferred for its lower mass and lesser water production for respirator systems in spacecraft. One gram of anhydrous lithium hydroxide can remove 450 cm3 of carbon dioxide gas. The monohydrate loses its water at 100–110 °C.

Precursor
Lithium hydroxide, together with lithium carbonate, is a key intermediates used for the production of other lithium compounds, illustrated by its use in the production of lithium fluoride:

Other uses 
It is also used in ceramics and some Portland cement formulations, where it is also used to suppress ASR (concrete cancer). 

Lithium hydroxide (isotopically enriched in lithium-7) is used to alkalize the reactor coolant in pressurized water reactors for corrosion control.
It is good radiation protection against free neutrons.

Price
In 2012, the price of lithium hydroxide was about $5-6/kg.

In December 2020 it had risen to $9/kg

On 18 March 2021 the price had risen to US$11.50/kg

See also 
Soda lime

References

External links 

 (anhydrous)
 (monohydrate)

Lithium compounds
Hydroxides